Events from the year 2021 in Scotland.

Incumbents 
First Minister and Keeper of the Great Seal – Nicola Sturgeon
Secretary of Scotland – Alister Jack

Events 
4 February – 2021 Kilmarnock incidents.
6 May – Elections to the devolved Scottish parliament take place. Voter turnout is the highest in a Scottish Parliament election to date, at 63.0%. The Scottish Nationalist Party improves its performance, finishing with 64 seats, just short of an overall majority. The Conservatives finish with 31 seats, Labour 22, Scottish Greens 8 and Liberal Democrats 4.
13 May
 2021 Airdrie and Shotts by-election
 Kenmure Street protests: protests occur after two Indian men living on Kenmure Street in Glasgow are taken from their home and detained by the Home Office in a van on the street for allegedly overstaying their visas. The men are released after 8 hours.
28 May – Murder of Esther Brown
1–12 November – The 26th session of the Conference of the Parties (COP26), a major United Nations climate summit, is held in Glasgow.
25-27 November - Storm Arwen causes widespread damage and power outages across Scotland.

Deaths 
 4 January – Kay Ullrich, politician, MSP 1999–2003 (born 1943)
 12 January – Willie Miller, urban planner (born 1950) 
 14 January – Vincent Logan, Roman Catholic prelate, Bishop of Dunkeld 1981–2012 (born 1941; COVID-19).
 14 February – Sir William Macpherson, High Court judge and clan chief (born 1926)
 11 May – Neil Connery, retired actor and younger brother of actor Sean Connery (born 1938)
 21 May – Ken MacKinnon, Scottish Gaelic sociolinguist (born 1933)
 17 June – Andrew Welsh, Scottish politician (born 1944)
 12 August – Una Stubbs, English actress (born 1937 in England)
 23 August – Elizabeth Blackadder, painter and printmaker (born 1931)
 23 August – Colin Bell, journalist, broadcaster and author (born 1938).
 15 October – Robert Black, auditor (born 1946)
 26 October – Walter Smith, Scottish association football player, manager and director (born 1948)
 5 December – Gary Callander, Scottish international rugby union player (born 1959)

See also 

2021 in England
2021 in Northern Ireland
2021 in Wales
Politics of Scotland

References